The 2015 Open Harmonie mutuelle was a professional tennis tournament played on hard courts. It was the twelfth edition of the tournament which was part of the 2015 ATP Challenger Tour. It took place in Saint-Brieuc, France between 6 April and 12 April 2015.

Singles main-draw entrants

Seeds

 Rankings are as of March 23, 2015.

Other entrants
The following players received wildcards into the singles main draw:
  Grégoire Barrère
  Grégoire Burquier
  Quentin Halys
  Laurent Rochette

The following players received entry from the qualifying draw:
  Richard Becker
  Constant Lestienne
  Hugo Nys
  Marcus Willis

Doubles main-draw entrants

Seeds

Other entrants
The following pairs received wildcards into the doubles main draw:
 Grégoire Barrère /  Marc Gicquel
 Rémi Boutillier /  Quentin Halys
 Grégoire Burquier /  Alexandre Sidorenko

Champions

Singles

  Nicolas Mahut def.  Yūichi Sugita, 3–6, 7–6(7–3), 6–4

Doubles

  Grégoire Burquier /  Alexandre Sidorenko def.  Andriej Kapaś /  Yasutaka Uchiyama, 6–3, 6–4

External links
Official Website

Open Harmonie mutuelle
Saint-Brieuc Challenger
2015 in French tennis
April 2015 sports events in France